Wild Horses Rock Steady is an album by jazz organist Johnny Hammond recorded for the Kudu label (a subsidiary of CTI Records) in 1971.

Reception

The Allmusic site awarded the album 3½ stars stating "Johnny Hammond's 1972 soul-jazz beauty is another stunning example of great creativity at Creed Taylor's Kudu label through the mid-'70s".

Track listing
 "Rock Steady" (Aretha Franklin) - 6:48  
 "Who Is Sylvia?" (Galt MacDermot) - 7:25  
 "Peace Train" (Cat Stevens) - 4:31  
 "I Don't Know How to Love Him" (Tim Rice, Andrew Lloyd Webber) - 7:35  
 "It's Impossible" (Armando Manzanero, Sid Wayne) - 5:27  
 "Wild Horses" (Mick Jagger, Keith Richards) - 6:26

Personnel
Johnny Hammond - organ, electric piano
Al DeRisi, Snooky Young - trumpet, flugelhorn (tracks 3, 4 & 6)
Wayne Andre - trombone (tracks 4 & 6)
Grover Washington, Jr. - tenor saxophone, alto saxophone (tracks 1-3, 5 & 6)
Harold Vick - tenor saxophone (tracks 3 & 6)
Pepper Adams - baritone saxophone (tracks 3, 4 & 6)
George Benson (tracks 4 & 5), Eric Gale (tracks 1, 2 & 6), Bob Mann (tracks 3, 4 & 6), Melvin Sparks (tracks 1, 4 & 6) - guitar
Ron Carter - double bass, electric bass
Billy Cobham (tracks 2-6), Bernard Purdie (track 1) - drums
Omar Clay (tracks 1 & 2), Airto Moreira (tracks 1, 2 & 4-6) - percussion
Julius Brand, Paul Gershman, Emanuel Green, Julius Held, Harry Katzman, Joe Malin, Gene Orloff, Max Polikoff - violin (tracks 1, 2, 4 & 5)
Bob James - arranger, conductor

Production
 Creed Taylor - producer
 Rudy Van Gelder - engineer

References

Johnny "Hammond" Smith albums
1972 albums
Kudu Records albums
Albums produced by Creed Taylor
Albums recorded at Van Gelder Studio